Jovana Preković (born 20 January 1996) is a Serbian karateka competing in kumite -61 kg division. She is a two-time world champion in the women's kumite 61 kg event (2018 and 2021) and the 2020 Olympic champion, in karate's lone appearance in Olympic Games program.

She defeated Yin Xiaoyan of China in the women's 61 kg event at the 2020 Summer Olympics in Tokyo, Japan.

Achievements

References

External links
 
 

1995 births
Living people
People from Aranđelovac
Serbian female karateka
European Games competitors for Serbia
European champions for Serbia
Karateka at the 2019 European Games
Karateka at the 2020 Summer Olympics
Olympic karateka of Serbia
Medalists at the 2020 Summer Olympics
Olympic medalists in karate
Olympic gold medalists for Serbia
20th-century Serbian women
21st-century Serbian women